The Miami Dolphins' flagship radio station is AM 560 WQAM. WQAM has previously carried Dolphins broadcasts during the 1997-04, and 2007-09 NFL Seasons. The radio broadcast team features Jimmy Cefalo providing play-by-play commentary and Joe Rose and Jason Taylor providing color commentary during regular season games. The Miami Dolphins Radio Network is a statewide network of radio stations in Florida.

Most preseason games are seen on WFOR (CBS) in Miami/Fort Lauderdale, WTVX (CW) in West Palm Beach/Fort Pierce, and WBBH (NBC) in Fort Myers with announcers Dick Stockton, Bob Griese, and Nat Moore.

ESPN reporter Hank Goldberg was a longtime color analyst on the Miami Dolphins Radio Network and hosted the Orange Bowl Express/Dolphin Express pre-game show on 610 WIOD.

Radio announcers

Preseason television announcers

Regular season television coverage

From their inaugural season in 1966 until the end of the 1988 season, the majority of the Dolphins' games were carried on WSVN, as it was the Miami area's NBC affiliate (NBC carried the AFL/AFC package from 1965–97). In 1989, after NBC purchased CBS affiliate WTVJ (then on channel 4), NBC programming, and thus the Dolphins games, moved there. Prior to that time, WTVJ starting in 1973 aired sold-out Dolphins home games in which they played an NFC opponent (CBS had the NFC package at that time). From 1989 through 1993, those games would air on WCIX (then on channel 6), which was bought by CBS.

In 1994, the NFC package moved to Fox, and WSVN (which became the Fox affiliate after the network purchases of WTVJ and WCIX) starting airing the Dolphins' interconference home games. In 1998, the AFC package moved to CBS and, locally, the former WCIX, now known as WFOR (as it had swapped dial positions with WTVJ three years earlier).

WPLG was the local carrier of Monday Night Football games through 2005. When the Dolphins play on Monday nights, they now air locally on WSFL-TV.

WFOR produces the local telecasts of the Dolphins' preseason games, pre-empting CBS programming which is shown on sister station WBFS-TV. The preseason games are simulcast in the adjacent West Palm Beach television market on area CW affiliate WTVX, which was a sister station of WFOR from 1997 until 2008; all regular-season games are currently telecast by that market's CBS affiliate WPEC.

References

 
Miami Dolphins
Miami Dolphins
broadcasters